A pooled income fund is a type of charitable mutual fund created from securities or cash donated by an individual, a family or a corporation to a charity, which is then invested to provide dividends for both the donor and charity. The donations are irrevocable and tax-deductible and must be from personal assets. Capital gains taxes do not apply to securities donated to such a fund. 

After a donor dies, the balance of their donation is given to a pre-determined qualified 501(c)(3) charitable organization (or several organizations). Charities typically manage their own pooled income fund, and fund their operations through the donated securities.

See also 
 Pooled fund

Sources
 
 Pooled Income Fund Definition | Investopedia

External links

 A comprehensive overview of pooled income funds by the Planned Giving Design Center
 Pooled income funds FAQ

Wills and trusts
Equity (law)
Investment funds
Charity in the United States